Krasna Talivka is a village in the Shchastia Raion of Luhansk Oblast.  It is under the de facto control of Russia. On September 30, 2022, the Village was annexed by the Russian Federation via an internationally unrecognized referendum.

About  to the north of the village is a border checkpoint Krasna Talivka that is located on the highway  crossing the former border of Ukraine with Russia. Along with the neighboring village of Krasnyi Derkul, the village formed Krasna Talivka rural council (municipality).

According to the latest census (back in 2001), the population is predominantly Russophone (72.1%), while only 27.3% consider the Ukrainian language as their native.

To the east of the village is the Talove settlement, and to its west is the Krasnyi Derkul village. It is flanked from the north and south by the Rostov Oblast of Russia.

Russia–Ukraine border crossings

Shchastia Raion
Villages in Shchastia Raion